Carlecotes is a village in the metropolitan borough of Barnsley in South Yorkshire, England.
Carlecotes is within Dunford civil parish.

Carlecotes' church, dedicated to St Anne, is in the united benefice of Penistone and Thurlstone, and the Diocese of Sheffield. The church was completed in 1857 as a private chapel to Carlecotes Hall, and is a Grade II listed building.

See also
Listed buildings in Dunford

References

External links

Villages in South Yorkshire
Geography of the Metropolitan Borough of Barnsley
Towns and villages of the Peak District